Nugal, traditionally known as Nugaaleed-Bari or Bari-Nugaal meaning eastern Nugaal, or Nugaal xaggeeda hoose meaning lower Nugaal, is an administrative region (gobol) in northern Somalia.

Overview

It is bordered by Sool to the west, Bari to the north, and Mudug to the south and the Somali Region of Ethiopia. The Somali Sea flanks the province to the east. Nugaal was during the 1970s merged with Sool province as a single province called Nugaal. According to Jaamac Cumar Ciise, the eastern parts of the Nugaal are called Nugaal xaggeeda hoose or Nugaal xeebeheeda hoose, meaning lower Nugaal and lower coastal Nugaal respectively. Nugal is centered on Garowe, which serves as the capital of the autonomous Puntland macro-region. The segments of the Nugaal valley from Garowe eastwards is traditionally referred to as Bari-Nugaaleed or Bari-Nugaal, whilst segments of the valley which converge into the Iyah plains are called Jednugaal. Nonetheless, Nugaal proper traditionally refers to segments of the valley west of Garowe.

Garowe 
Nugal is centered on Garowe, which serves as the capital of the autonomous Puntland macro-region. A major geographic feature of the region is the Nugaal Valley, a large shallow drainage basin fed by the Nugal and Dheer seasonal rivers during the April–June rainy season. The region was established on February 8, 1973.

Kobo 
Towards the east, Nugaal Valley is separated from Nugaaleed-Bari via the region known as Kobo. Kobo was described in colonial sources ruminating about Dervish strength as follows:

Districts
The Nugal region consists of five districts:

Burtinle District
Eyl District
Garowe District
Dangorayo District
Xarxar District

Major towns

Burtinle
Dangorayo
Eyl
Garowe
Godobjiran

References

External links
 Administrative map of Nugal

 
Puntland
Regions of Somalia